L'Odissea is a 1911 Italian silent film, the third known adaptation from Homer's Odyssey. The film was made in the context of the world's fair of Turin International in 1911, on the occasion of the 50th anniversary of the unification of Italy, where he  launched a film competition for films artistic, scientific and with educational purposes.

Released in 1912 in the United States it was welcomed, in the trade journal The Moving Picture World, the film was proclaimed as marking "a new epoch in the history of the motion picture as a factory of education".

Plot

Reception
London City Nights said the film " was an interesting watch: the 1911 equivalent of a summer blockbuster, and a chance to see the past come alive in two ways; firstly in the depiction of Ancient Greece and secondly in the film itself as historical text."

References

External links 
 

1911 films
1911 short films
Italian silent short films
Italian black-and-white films
Films directed by Giuseppe de Liguoro
Films based on the Odyssey
World's fair films
Articles containing video clips